Flunked is a 2008 documentary film conceived by and executive produced by Steven Maggi, directed by Corey Burres and narrated by actor Joe Mantegna. It explores problems in the United States public education system and reviews successful education reform solutions in both charter and public schools, letting leading educators tell their stories.

Synopsis
Flunked studies the relatively poor position of the United States public education system; in the 2015 Programme for International Student Assessment, the country's mean performance was merely average among the OECD member states tested, and according to a 2015 survey of members of the American Association for the Advancement of Science, just 16% of them called American K-12 STEM education above average or best. The film also, though, explores some of the system's successes.

The first 20 minutes review many of the system's problems, as well as schools nationwide that prepared students well for college in the 2000s. Based on their high test scores, their graduates seemed capable of working and competing in tomorrow's economy. The documentary shows ways to reform troubled public schools, as well as alternatives to them, including charter schools.

Cast
Jim Anderson
Steve Barr (Green Dot Public Schools)
Ben Chavis (American Indian Public Charter School, Oakland, CA)
Bill Cosby
Andrew Coulson
Eric Dominguez
Heidi Dominguez
Angie Dorman
Bill Gates
Donn Harris
Lynn Harsh
Guilbert Hentschke
Bob Herbold
Charlie Hoff
Therese Holliday
Karen Jones
Jeff Kropf
Howard Lappin
Steven Maggi
Joe Mantegna, narrator
John Merrifield
Dan Nicklay
Dennis Pantano
Bill Proser
David Scortt
Jason Singer
Caitlyn Snaring
Traci Snaring
Matt Sween
Matt Wingard

Reception
Flunked won Best Documentary at the San Fernando Valley International Film Festival in Los Angeles, Best Educational Documentary at the Bayou City Inspirational Film Festival in Houston, the Award of Merit from the Accolade Competition, and the first ever SPNovation Award.

References

External links

2008 films
American documentary films
Documentary films about education in the United States
2008 documentary films
2000s English-language films
2000s American films